Bra sausage (in Piedmontese sautissa ëd Bra) is a sausage recognized as an Italian Traditional Agri-food Product (P.A.T.). The sausage is produced in Piedmont, exclusively in the city of Bra, by butchers associated with the Consortium for the Protection and Enhancement of Bra Sausage.

Origins 
The Bra sausage was once produced without using pork fat and was mainly intended for the Jewish community of Cherasco, which supplied itself with meat at the nearby market of Bra. As members of the Jewish religion, they were prevented from consuming pork-based sausages. A royal decree of 1847 acknowledged the Braidese custom allowing the butchers of the municipality to produce fresh beef sausage, which was prohibited in the rest of the country.

Preparation 
The sausage is prepared with lean beef (70-80%) and pork fat for the remainder.

Consumption 
Bra sausage can be eaten both cooked (in particular on the grill) and raw in the fresh state, in this case often as appetizer or as a topping for pizza and crostini.

References

Italian sausages
Italian products with protected designation of origin
Cuisine of Piedmont